Kondagunturu is situated in East Godavari district in Rajanagaram, in Andhra Pradesh State. The village also forms a part of Godavari Urban Development Authority.

References 

Villages in East Godavari district